Sel Roti is a traditional Nepalese ring-shaped sweet fried dough made from rice flour. It is mostly prepared during Dashain and Tihar, widely celebrated Hindu festivals in Nepal as well as Darjeeling, Kalimpong and Sikkim regions in India. The dish is popular throughout Nepal and among the Nepalese diaspora. Sel roti is made from a batter of rice flour, water sugar, ghee, and spices which is then deep fried in cooking oil.

Origin and etymology 
Dinesh Raj Panta, a professor at Nepal Sanskrit University estimates this dish to be over 800 years old. According to Madhulika Dash, an Indian food columnist, the dish was made bland many years ago, without sugar and spices. Over the years with intermingling of various ethnicities of Nepal, the dish has reached in its modern form. Dash also estimates that sel roti may have been a modified form of Babari, a Nepalese rice pancake. Babari is made of the same batter but is cooked like a pancake on a shallow griddle while sel roti is ring shaped and deep fried on a karahi. 

The name of the dish is assumed to be derived from Sel, a variety of rice that grows in the foothills of Nepal. Roti in Nepali translates to bread. Another theory also suggests that the name of the dish is from Saal, Nepali word for year. Since the dish was developed to be a ceremonial dish made on Nepalese new year, it may have been called Saal roti, which later had become Sel roti.

Preparation and ingredients

It is made of rice flour with added flavours. A batter is prepared by adding water, sugar, and ghee to roughly grinded rice flour. The ghee can also be substituted by cooking oil or butter. Spices such as cardamom and clove could also be added to the batter. The ingredients are then let to rest for a couple of hours. Once the batter is set, it is deep fried in cooking oil or ghee. Instead of water, milk can also be used to prepare the batter. However, using milk can reduce the shelf life of the dish. 

The dough is poured by hand in a ring shape into boiling oil and cooked on medium heat (around 348 °F to 373 °F) until it turns light brown on both sides.

Sel roti are cooked in bulk and can be stored at room temperature for least 20 days. Sel roti are often sent as special gifts to family members living away from home or used as prasada, a religious offering.

Occasions and variations
Sel roti is a delicacy, made mainly for the great Nepali celebration of the Dashain and Tihar festivals. It is unique to Nepal and has become an iconic symbol of Nepali culture and festivities, and is made and served throughout the country during festivals as well as during wedding parties, and other ceremonies.

It is also a traditional food in Nepali-speaking communities in Darjeeling, Sikkim, Siliguri and Kalimpong regions of India and southern Bhutan. It is an essential food at most Nepalese and Kumaoni cultural and traditional events. Instead of traditional single ring shape, in Sikkim, Darjeeling and Kalimpong areas, Sel roti is also made in double ring shape. 

Singhal, a dish from Kumaon region in Uttarakhand state of India, is similar to Sel roti but while Sel roti is made from rice flour, Singhal is prepared from semolina flour.

Gallery

See also
 List of doughnut varieties
 List of fried dough varieties

References

External links

Fried dough
Doughnuts
Nepalese cuisine
Bhutanese cuisine
Indian cuisine
Roti